Labeobarbus nthuwa is a species of cyprinid fish in the genus Labeobarbus which is found only in the South Rukuru River in northern Malawi.

References 

nthuwa
Fish described in 2008